United States gubernatorial elections were held on October 22 and November 3, 1983, in three states and one territory. Following the elections, the Democratic party held all three seats.

Election results
A bolded state name features an article about the specific election.